Daniel Mendaille (27 November 1885 – 17 May 1963) was a French stage and film actor whose career spanned nearly sixty years.

Early life
Born Daniel Henri Elie Mendaille in Tours, Indre-et-Loire, Mendaille studied architecture at the Académie royale d'architecture, Institut de France in Paris. At age twenty, he abandoned his studies in architecture and enrolled in the Conservatoire de Paris and studied acting under Paul Mounet. After graduating, he was engaged at the Théâtre des Variétés, Cirque d'Hiver, Théâtre Antoine and the l’Œuvre et de la Renaissance.

Film career
During the early 1900s, he began appearing in small roles in film. One of his first roles was in the 1909 Albert Capellani-directed short La mort du duc d'Enghien en 1804 (English release title: The Death of the Duc d'Enghien) for the Société Cinématographique des Auteurs et Gens de Lettres (SCAGL), affiliated with Pathé-Frères

 
Mendaille continued to work in theater and film throughout the 1910s and 1920s. Already a featured actor, he began performing in leading roles in such films as Léon Poirier's in Le coffret de jade (1921), Marcel Dumont's La proie (1921) and Robert Péguy's Le crime de Monique (1922). In 1923, he portrayed the Comte de Maupry in L'affaire du courrier de Lyon for Gaumont Film Company and was also part of the cast of Surcouf (1924) and Jean Chouan (1925), both serials directed by Luitz-Morat. In 1927 he appeared in the epic silent French historical film Napoléon directed by Abel Gance and the following year in the World War I silent docudrama Verdun: Visions of History opposite Albert Préjean, Suzanne Bianchetti, Berthe Jalabert and Antonin Artaud.

Daniel Mendaille had little difficulty transitioning to the sound era of films. Notable performances of the 1930s include the portrayal of a miner in Georg Wilhelm Pabst's La tragédie de la mine (1931), the French-language version of Fritz Lang's The Testament of Dr. Mabuse (1933), a diplomat in Alexis Granowsky's Moscow Nights opposite French actress Annabella (1934), as Gaston Roude in the first film adaptation of Émile Zola's L'Assommoir (1933) and as Micheletto, the chief henchman in Abel Gance's historical drama Lucrèce Borgia (1935).

Throughout the 1940s and 1950s, Mendaille would often be relegated to supporting roles as a character actor or in bit parts, with notable performances in such films as Jacques Becker's Casque d'Or (1952), Max Ophüls' The Earrings of Madame de… (1953), Christian-Jaque's adaptation of Émile Zola's Nana (1955) and Max Ophüls' Lola Montès (1955). Mendaille appeared in approximately 120 films.

Personal life
Daniel Mendaille was married to Spanish-born actress Leda Ginelly. Following Ginelly's death in April 1959, he retired from performing and lived a secluded life at the family residence in Couilly-Pont-aux-Dames, where he died in May 1963 at age 77.

Selected filmography

References

External links

1885 births
1963 deaths
French male stage actors
French male film actors
French male silent film actors
Actors from Tours, France
20th-century French male actors